Power Pack is a superhero team consisting of four young siblings appearing in American comic books published by Marvel Comics. Created by writer Louise Simonson and artist June Brigman, they first appeared in their own series in 1984, which lasted 62 issues, and have since appeared in other books. Power Pack is the first team of pre-teen superheroes in the Marvel Universe and the first team of heroes in comics to feature characters of that age operating without adult supervision. In 2005, the title was relaunched as a series aimed at younger readers—though this was eventually declared a separate continuity from that of the original series and the mainstream Marvel Universe.

The team consists of four siblings: Alex Power, Julie Power, Jack Power, and Katie Power. The dying alien called Whitey, a scientist of the Kymellian race, transfers one of his four superpowers to each of the Power children so they can save their planet from the alien conquerors known as the Snarks. The children band together as the superhero team Power Pack. Along with fighting aliens and super-villains, the team's stories were known for focusing on morality debates and social issues such as child abuse, homelessness, drug abuse, bullying, and the ethics of using excessive or lethal force in combat.

Publication history

Original series
During the early 1980s, Marvel Comics had a policy that all their editors should also be writers. Louise Simonson  was encouraged to think of a series she could write, and eventually she pitched a team of pre-teen siblings with superpowers called Power Pack. Simonson later explained:

Simonson chose June Brigman as Power Pack'''s penciler because of her talent for drawing children. The Power Pack series premiered in May 1984 (cover date August 1984) in a double-sized issue inked by Bob Wiacek. The series continued into 1991, during which time Brigman and Wiacek were replaced by Jon Bogdanove and Hilary Barta as principal artists. The Power Pack letters column, titled "Pick of the Pack", printed drawings and jokes about the characters submitted by readers, an unusual practice for a Marvel title.

In the first story of the series, the alien Kymellian known as Whitey is fatally injured by the alien villains known as Snarks. He gives the four Power children his powers before dying. His mass control power goes to Jack, his energy and disintegration power goes to Katie, his ability to fly goes to Julie, and his control over gravity goes to Alex. In issue #25, the team's powers are temporarily stolen, then returned but rearranged. Due to this "power switch", each Power Pack child now has an ability wielded by one of their siblings, leading to a change in codenames. The Power Pack children finally switched their costumes to match their new powers in issue #47. In issue #52, another rearrangement of powers and codenames occurred.

Unlike superheroes such as Spider-Man or Batman who were orphaned, free agents, or teenagers often trusted to be on their own without supervision, Power Pack was made up of pre-adolescent siblings who had a close relationship with each other, as well as their supportive parents Jim and Maggie Power. Early in the series, the children decided to keep their powers and superhero activities concealed from their parents, believing it would cause them stress and worry. This decision led to several moral compromises and feelings of guilt for the Power Pack members whenever they had to lie to friends and family or allow harm to occur because helping could mean revealing their abilities. The question of whether or not the powers should be revealed was also an ongoing source of debate among the children. Power Pack readers also argued the matter out in the series letter pages. During Jon Bogdanove's story "Revenge of the Bogeyman", which served as a tie-in for the crossover Inferno, the parents learn their children are superheroes. In an epilogue to the story, writer Julianna Jones depicted Jim and Maggie Power as so overwhelmed by the situation that they increasingly suffer psychological breakdowns and become convinced that they are not fit parents for superheroes. To help the Power family, the New Mutants team convinces Jim and Maggie Power that they were deceived and their children were never superheroes. This restored the secret identity status quo and led Power Pack to keep their heroic lives a secret again.

Despite the characters of Power Pack being children, the series often dealt with mature issues. Many of the social problems of the 1980s found their way into the book's storylines. Among the themes addressed were pollution, drug abuse, runaways, kidnapping, gun violence, bullying, orphanhood, and homelessness. Stories regularly depicted the Power children learning and debating how to use their potentially lethal powers responsibly, often on their own but sometimes with guidance from older heroes such as Spider-Man. In one early issue, Jack was wracked with remorse when he thought he had killed a man. In a later story arc, Katie seriously injures a Snark prince named Jakal, which causes her immense guilt and leads her to call herself a "monster".

As the series went on, the children were shown to slowly age and mature. In issue #1, Alex is 12 years old, Julie is 10, Jack is 8, and Katie is 5. In issue #45, Julie graduates from elementary school with honors in English, and the story says she will join Alex at school 44 (an actual middle school existing in New York City).

The same year Power Pack debuted, the team appeared alongside Spider-Man in a special comic designed to discuss children targeted by sexual abuse. The one-shot issue, written by Louise Simonson, was distributed for free and reprinted in the comics sections of many major newspapers. Marvel continued the campaign by featuring the characters in print public service announcements. Later the same year, the writers used the Snark Wars storyline (wherein the children are kidnapped by the evil Snark alien race) to address the issue of child abduction. During the same storyline, photos of missing children were printed in lieu of the comic's regular letters column. In 1989, the Power Pack teamed-up with Cloak and Dagger in a special graphic novel addressing teen homelessness and runaways. Hotline telephone numbers for Covenant House were printed on the back cover.

Along with Spider-Man and the duo of Cloak and Dagger, Power Pack frequently encountered members of the X-Men and New Mutants. In issue #16, they met Franklin Richards (son of Mr. Fantastic and Invisible Woman of the Fantastic Four), and in issue #17 Franklin became a part-time member of Power Pack himself. He joined on many other adventures, occasionally staying with the Power family for days at a time when his own family were off on adventures.

Starting with issue #34, the Power Pack series regularly rotated writers. Simonson wrote issues #35, #37, and #39–40, while John Bogdanove wrote issue #36, issues #42–43, and issues #47–52. Howard Mackie wrote issue #34, Julianna Jones wrote issues #38 and #44–45, Steven Heyer wrote #41, Terry Austin wrote issues #46 and #53, Judy Bogdanove wrote #54, and Dwayne McDuffie wrote issue #55. During Jon Bogdanove's final issues, Franklin Richards returned as a regular member of the team.

Further changes involved Alex Power mutating into a Kymellian appearance without explanation, forcing him to hide from his girlfriend Allison (who soon dates someone else) as well as from public life. The series was cancelled with issue #62. The final issue, printed in the fourth quarter of 1990 (cover-dated February 1991), depicted the team and their parents journeying into space together.

One year after the original series' cancellation, creators Louise Simonson and June Brigman teamed up for the one-shot issue Power Pack Holiday Special (published in fourth quarter of 1991, with a cover date of February 1992). The one-shot comic resolved the cliffhanger the series had ended on, restored the Power Pack members' original powers, and undid some of the changes to the characters done during the run by Michael Higgins and Tom Morgan. Power Pack Holiday Special also included a short comedy story involving an art style that evoked Calvin and Hobbes, and a short story that showed an older, teenage Julie dealing with romance and self-esteem issues.

The Power Pack stories were reprinted by Marvel UK beginning around 1986. It was Marvel UK's practice at the time to use a less well-known series as a secondary story in a comic devoted to more recognizable characters, and Power Pack became the back-up "strip" in a run of Marvel's licensed Star Wars weekly Return of the Jedi. During this period, it was printed partly in black and white and partly in color, as was the main Star Wars strip. Power Pack subsequently became the back-up strip for the UK ThunderCats comic, where it remained until its eventual replacement by the Galaxy Rangers series.

2000 miniseries
A four-part Power Pack mini-series published in 2000 depicted the children as now being slightly older than when they had last been in the 1991 Power Pack Holiday Special. Katie was now in the fifth grade (having skipped two grades due to her intelligence), Jack had joined Julie in middle school, and Alex was now a teenager in high school. James and Maggie, the children's parents, were now aware that their children were also the heroes of Power Pack and accepted it. The Power children now wore masks when in costume and their superhero activities were largely restricted to "practice sessions" in the forest around their new home in Bainbridge Island,  from Seattle. The series once again pitted the Pack against Queen Mauraud and the Snarks.

Return of Power Pack
Joe Quesada announced in a New Joe Fridays column at Newsarama that Power Pack would be returning to the Marvel Universe in late 2007, after the events of Civil War.NEWSARAMA.COM: NEW JOE FRIDAYS – WEEK 35, A WEEKLY Q&A WITH JOE QUESADA  However, due to the various delays within their release shipping schedules for Marvel Comics, these plans were put on hold. A new Power Pack story was commissioned for the 2007 Marvel Holiday Special, which would have been the first original material featuring the full cast in the standard Marvel Universe since the 2000 mini-series. It was briefly summarized as "Power Pack relives holidays past" in official Marvel solicits, but the story was scrapped from the publication at the last minute, when it was decided to prioritize the recently canceled title The Loners, which featured Julie Power among its cast. A Loners story written by CB Cebulski ran in place of the Power Pack story, though the official solicitation information still listed the Power Pack story and description.

Three of the Power siblingsAlex, Jack, and Katieappear within Fantastic Four #574 (2010) as guests celebrating Franklin Richards' birthday. They were all depicted as only slightly older than they had been in the 2000 mini-series, with Alex still a teenager. During the story, Alex was invited to join Reed Richards' Future Foundation. He then made frequent appearances in the Fantastic Four series.

In 2020, a 5-issue limited series written by Ryan North and illustrated by Nico Leon began publication as part of Marvel's Outlawed event.

Fictional team history
At the beginning
Alex (age 12), Julie (10), Jack (8),Comment from editors in Power Pack #9 "Pick of the Pack" letters column, regarding Alex's "my brother is almost 8" comment in issue #6: "Alex did screw up! Jack is almost nine! Alex was so flustered by meeting Spider-Man that he could hardly talk straight...and boy is Jack mad! He figures it's no wonder that Spider-Man treated them like babies! He thought Jack was a whole year younger than he is!" and Katie Power (5) were bright, normal American children living with their parents in a beachfront house in Virginia. Their father, Dr. James Power, was a brilliant physicist who discovered a process to generate energy from antimatter with the assistance of a converter, of which he made a prototype. The process was, however, known to several alien races to cause chain reactions and destroy planets, and Dr. Power's knowledge of the process was discovered by Aelfyre "Whitey" Whitemane, a member of the Kymellian race, who resemble humanoid horses. A similar accident destroyed the Kymellians' home planet.

Whitey tried to stop the experiment by warning the Powers but was mortally wounded by his enemies, the reptilian Snarks, in the process. The Snarks kidnapped Dr. Power and his wife, Margaret, hoping to obtain the secret of antimatter. Whitey rescued the Power children and told them what was happening. Before dying, he passed his powers to them to complete his mission.

The children, with the help of Whitey's "Smartship", a sentient starship called Friday, managed to stop the antimatter test by stealing and destroying the converter and rescued their parents from the Snarks. They decided to continue being superheroes and to hide their powers from their parents. Alex took the codename Gee, Julie became Lightspeed, Jack became Mass Master, and Katie became Energizer. They wore costumes made for them by Friday, which were actually Kymellian spacesuits. The costumes, which were constructed of unstable molecules and stored 'Elsewhere', could materialize and disappear on voice command.

After rescuing their parents, the entire family moves to New York City, where the team attempted to deal with normal "kid problems" such as bullies and loose teeth while battling some of the deadliest villains in the Marvel Universe. The Pack fought the villain Kurse on two occasions during Secret Wars II. They were also heavily involved in the events of the Fall of the Mutants and Inferno storylines. During the Mutant Massacre, they descended into the sewers and fought Sabretooth.

The Pack's two greatest enemies during the original series were the Snarks and Carmody/The Bogeyman. The Snarks generally attempted to kidnap the Power children and steal their powers. Carmody, James Power's former employer, spotted the Power children when they stole the antimatter converter at the beginning of the series and became obsessed with revenge. At first, he tried to work with government agencies to prove the Powers were mutants. Later, he became a supervillain himself, assuming the identity of the Bogeyman. After being thrown into Limbo by Magik of the New Mutants, he returned in a demonic form and nearly killed the entire Power family before ultimately committing suicide.

Power Pack joined forces with Cloak & Dagger, the X-Men and the New Mutants on numerous occasions.

The team took great pains to conceal their superhuman abilities from their family and "normal" friends. However, during Inferno, when confronted by the demonic Carmody, the children were forced to reveal their powers to save their parents. The discovery led Jim and Maggie to have mental breakdowns. They were restored to normal through the combined efforts of Mirage and Gosamyr, who convinced them that the superpowered children were clones created to protect them from Carmody and that the "real" Power children, who were powerless, had been taken away and guarded by the New Mutants until Carmody was defeated. This explanation placated their parents and, once they were reunited with their "normal" children, their minds healed themselves. The "clones", which had been generated by Mirage, were then removed, making the children's secret safe once again. This "cover-up" proved to be unpopular with readers, and was highly criticized in the comic's letters column.

Another occasional member of the team was Franklin Richards, the son of Mister Fantastic and the Invisible Woman, who went by the name Tattletale while adventuring. James and Margaret Power were introduced to Franklin after the events of the Snark Wars, and befriended Reed and Sue Richards when Franklin was returned to Avengers Mansion. Subsequently, Franklin was often invited to stay with the Power family while his parents were away on missions. Although Franklin was a member of the group, the Fantastic Four had no knowledge of Power Pack until the end of the series; instead, they thought of the Power children simply as "Franklin's friends".

End of the series
Sometime later, Alex underwent a transformation into a Kymellian, and Margaret Power began losing her mind. The Power family sought help for Margaret and Alex in various places, beginning with Reed Richards' lab, but their efforts were disrupted by the Red Ghost and his super apes.

The Power family traveled to the UK to try to find help for Margaret and Alex, but the institute was overrun by Nightmare and they encountered Excalibur. After that the Powers visited the Caribbean. The children planned to enjoy the sun and sand while their father consulted with colleagues but found themselves confronted with what seemed to be an alien attack on the beach where they were relaxing.

The family decided to abandon New York and fly with Friday to New Kymellia to seek help for Alex and his mother.

Both Alex and his parents had been replaced by "pseudoplasm" doubles by a renegade Kymellian Technocrat and his ally, the exiled Maraud (called Meraud in this storyline). The real Alex and his parents were being held captive in the Technocrat's hidden satellite orbiting New Kymellia. Eventually, the other Power siblings learned the truth and rescued their family, switching powers several times as needed, and barely escaping from the satellite before it was destroyed by Maraud.

After recovering on New Kymellia, the Power family returned to New York with Friday. Each of the children was back in possession of his or her original power, and their parents remained unaware of their children's powers and of Power Pack's existence.

Post-series
Alex, New Warriors and the Future Foundation
The Kymellians had given Alex the ability to absorb the powers of his siblings into himself and thus use them all. With these powers, he joined the New Warriors superhero group under the name Powerpax, later Powerhouse. This caused some friction with Alex's brother and sisters; even their parents noticed the heightened levels of hostility and forced the children to see a psychologist. Alex eventually gave the others' powers back; the four reverted to their original names (except Alex, who named himself Zero-G and Julie, who was now called Starstreak, the name Katie had chosen when she had Julie's powers). Speedball later tried to recruit Alex back into the New Warriors. Alex politely refused, citing the conflicts his membership would cause among his siblings, though Katie offered her services, to Speedball's chagrin.

At some point outside of any published story, their parents discovered that the children had superpowers and were active as superheroes. Why Power Pack's parents could now retain this information without suffering mental trauma and insanity – thanks to telepathic manipulation by Byrel Whitemane that had previously been established as impossible to circumvent – has not been explained.

Following the events of the 2000 mini-series, Julie left the family home in unrevealed circumstances to try to become an actress in Los Angeles. Despite Julie's departure from Power Pack, the team defeats Big Wheel. Katie is later seen in costume having beaten several A.I.M. agents unconscious, when Flatman and Doorman offered her membership in the Great Lakes Avengers but she declined, and Power Pack fight Grizzly in New Jersey, a sighting which is used as his alibi against charges that he robbed Madison Square Garden.

During Marvel's Civil War event, Alex's codename Powerhouse was briefly mentioned by Hindsight Lad, an ex-teammate responsible for outing the secret identities of many New Warriors. Alex is one of the 142 registered superheroes who appear on the cover of the comic book Avengers: The Initiative #1.

He later joined Reed Richards' Future Foundation project, which allowed gifted children living within the Baxter Building to map out the outlook for their generation.

Julie, Excelsior/Loners, Avengers Academy and Future Foundation
Sometime after the events of the 2000 mini-series, Julie Power concluded that adventuring had deprived her of a normal childhood. She dropped out of high school, left her family, and moved to Los Angeles to become an actress. She joined Excelsior, a support group for "former" teenage superheroes, where she is once again known as Lightspeed. Excelsior's first mission was to return the members of the Runaways to the foster care from which the children had absconded and ended with Excelsior battling Ultron. Though they are not seen on-panel, it is then established that Excelsior spend several months attempting to recapture the child cast of the Runaways, but are constantly thwarted by being ineffectual, getting roped into cleaning up after the Runaways' crimefighting exploits, and on occasion simply by being outsmarted by the Runaways.

The Loners are all registered under the Superhuman Registration Act, but consider themselves retired from super-heroics when they are not battling superpowered menaces or operating in public as superheroes attempting to capture runaway superpowered children. However, Julie later tells the rest of the group that she is not registered. While she is less intelligent and articulate than previously established, Julie reveals in Loners #4 that this is merely an affectation she adopts for the benefit of others – she pretends to be a "dumb blonde" to fit in with Los Angelenos. It had previously been established that Julie is a redhead, her "blonde" hair the result of using light hues in the production of the comic's art to reflect the brighter climate of the west coast.

The Loners' support group has moved to New York City, where Julie is presumably seen, though not named, at recent meetings. As with the cast's sudden relocation to Los Angeles from New York between the cancellation of their series and the beginning of Runaways volume 2, the move is not explained.

Julie was seen among the other young superheroes to arrive on the new campus for the Avengers Academy, where she is attending classes as a teacher assistant, under Quicksilver's tutelage.

Sometime after Julie ended the relationship with Karolina Dean, she was dealing with her depression and dropping out of college; when Alex & Dragon Man appeared in her apartment and recruited her on a rescue mission to help save the Foundation. Afterward, she joined the team as both teacher and Co-leader of the FF.

Members
The Power siblings have changed powers on several occasions and are the core of the Pack.

Other versions
Age of Apocalypse
During the Age of Apocalypse, the Power children had been captured and used by Beast in his gruesome experiments which ended with fusing the four siblings together. They were later dissected, and kept sealed in containing tubes at his secret laboratory in the Yucatán.

All-ages miniseries
A new Power Pack miniseries debuted in 2005. Written by Marc Sumerak and penciled by Gurihiru Studios, it mostly ignored previous Power Pack continuity and was aimed toward young children. Marvel later noted that these stories take place on Earth-5631 as opposed to the established mainstream Marvel continuity of Earth-616. Although the initial four-issue series was not released under the Marvel Age imprint because of editorial decisions, it was later reprinted in digest format under the Marvel Age banner. Each of these first four issues focussed on one of the Power children and their respective troubles in balancing the secret of their powers with the demands of their daily lives.

A second Power Pack miniseries by the same creative team, X-Men & Power Pack, debuted in October 2005. The series guest-starred various members and villains from the X-Men comics, including Cyclops, Wolverine, Sabretooth, Beast, Mystique, Nightcrawler, and Mister Sinister and his Marauders. The Circus of Crime also makes an appearance.

A third Power Pack miniseries, titled Avengers & Power Pack: Assemble! debuted in April 2006. This series teamed the Pack with various members of the Avengers: Captain America, Iron Man, Spider-Man, and Spider-Woman. Issues #3 & #4 were a two-part adventure in which the Pack and the Avengers battled Kang the Conqueror, although the latter's plot of conquest which culminates in these two volumes spans the whole miniseries.

A fourth Power Pack miniseries, titled Spider-Man & Power Pack, debuted in November 2006. The series featured Spider-Man and some of his rogue's gallery, such as the Vulture, Sandman, and Venom. The miniseries included two sub-plots: in one, Spider-Man was reduced in age and temporarily joined the Power siblings; the second involved the group teaming up with Spidey to capture Venom symbiote costumes that had been taking control of various women – including Mary-Jane Watson – during part one, and then Katie in part two.

A fifth Power Pack miniseries, Hulk & Power Pack, debuted in March 2007, following the events of the Spider-Man and Power Pack miniseries. The series involved the Hulk and his enemies the Absorbing Man, Abomination, and Zzzax. The miniseries was drawn by David Williams (except for issue #3, which was drawn by Andy Kuhn).

A sixth Power Pack miniseries, Fantastic Four & Power Pack, debuted in July 2007, co-starring the Fantastic Four, who made a previous appearance in issue #3 of the first Power Pack miniseries. Gurihiru Studios returned for the artwork; however, Fred Van Lente replaced Mark Sumerak as writer. The series pitted the Pack against the Fantastic Four's enemies and also featured Franklin Richards, who, as Tattletale, was a member of Power Pack in the regular Marvel Universe.

A seventh Power Pack miniseries, Iron Man & Power Pack, debuted in November 2007, co-starring Iron Man, who had previously appeared in the Avengers & Power Pack: Assemble! miniseries. The series was written by Marc Sumerak and the artwork was by Marcelo Diachara. Opponents include the Puppet Master, the Ghost, Blizzard, Speed Demon and Ultimo. James Rhodes and Pepper Potts also have guest appearances.

An eighth Power Pack miniseries, titled Power Pack: Day One debuted in March 2008. The series, which featured the same creative team as Fantastic Four & Power Pack (Fred Van Lente and Gurihiru), focused on the origins of the team and the incorporation of their new member, Franklin Richards. This series is credited as being "based on" the origin tale from the 1984 series by Louise Simonson and June Brigman, though it is lighter in tone, has a shorter page-count, and changes some plot elements. The series also included scientific back-up information about the physical aspects of the siblings' powers, with artwork by Colleen Coover.

A ninth series, Skrulls vs Power Pack, made its debut in July 2008. The storyline involved Power Pack encountering the alien Skrulls. This miniseries also introduced the Kymellian Kofi Whitemane to this continuity. The creative team was Fred Van Lente as writer and Cory Hamscher as artist. Gurihiru provided the covers and the colors.

A tenth miniseries, Wolverine and Power Pack, made its debut in November 2008. Wolverine had previously appeared in the X-Men and Power Pack miniseries. The series reunited the original creative team of Marc Sumerak and Gurihiru. Logan and the four children confronted Sauron, faced the Danger Room, and defended the Xavier school against Sentinels, giant robots programmed for anti-mutant genocide. Since the Power siblings are not actually mutants, their intervention was decisive in the outcome of the latter battle. Logan and Power Pack have adventures together in 19th-century New York City and 20th-century Tokyo.

An eleventh Power Pack miniseries began in April 2010, with Thor appearing and co-headlining, called Thor And The Warriors Four. The creative team is writer Alex Zalben and artwork once again by Gurihiru. Thor and the Power children confront an evil plot of Loki's while trying to save the Powers' grandmother. High points include Alex wielding Mjolnir, Beta Ray Bill and the other Asgardians turning into children, a guest appearance by Lockjaw and the Pet Avengers, and Dr. Donald Blake making applesauce. The series also contains a back-up adventure of Hercules telling the story of his Twelve Labors while babysitting the Pack.

Mini Marvels
In a Mini Marvels short, Spider-Man is hired to babysit the infant Power children.

House of M
Alex and Julie appear in House of M: Avengers #3 as members of a superpowered gang called the Wolfpack, the House of M's version of the New Warriors.

Marvel 2099
In the alternate Marvel 2099 timeline, Julie, Jack, and Kate appear as adults, apparently having aged at a greatly reduced rate as a result of their powers. Alchemax CEO J. Jonah Jameson hires them to take down Captain America 2099 and Spider-Man 2099. Eventually, it is revealed that they are actually Skrulls who have been brainwashed into believing they are Power Pack.

Marvel Zombies
The zombified Power children appear in Marvel Zombies vs. The Army of Darkness #3. They come into conflict with Nextwave, who have not been infected at that point but are ruthlessly dispatched off-panel moments later. An explosion violently kills all of them but Alex, who appears in Marvel Zombies Halloween with other zombies attacking Kitty Pryde and her son Peter.

MC2
Katie, going by Kate, appears in issues 2–5 of A-Next. During a conversation with American Dream, she indicates that something tragic happened to one of her brothers, but the details of the situation remain unclear.

Millennial Visions
In the "Power Pack: Starting Over" story within Marvel's 2001 Millennial Visions one-shot comic, the team is depicted as a group of adults ranging from 25 (Katie) to 32 (Alex). In this alternate universe, the siblings split up after their parents were killed by anti-mutant activists and led disparate lives until Julie reunites them to face a new Snark attack.

New Mutants
In an issue of New Mutants, Katie appears in a dystopian future ruled by Sunspot. She has all of her siblings' powers, explaining that this is because they were killed some time ago. She fights for the rights of downtrodden humans and helps the time-lost members of the New Mutants find their way home.

Renew Your Vows
The siblings appear in the miniseries Spider-Man: Renew Your Vows as schoolmates of Peter Parker's daughter Annie. They are forced to go into hiding when it is discovered that they have superhuman abilities and are taken in by S.H.I.E.L.D.

X-Force
A young girl called Francine Power appears in an alternate future in X-Force Annual #1, operating under the name Powerpax. She has all of the powers of the various members of Power Pack and wears a costume similar to the one later worn by Alex Power in the pages of New Warriors.

Collected editions
{| class="wikitable" style="width:100%;"
|-
! Title
! Material collected
! Format
! Publication date
! ISBN
|-
| Power Pack Origin Album| Power Pack (1984) #1–4
| TPB
| May 1988
| 
|-
| Power Pack Classic volume 1| Power Pack (1984) #1–10
| TPB
| July 2009
| 
|-
| Power Pack Classic volume 2| Power Pack (1984) #11–17; Uncanny X-Men #195; Power Pack & Cloak and Dagger: Shelter from the Storm| TPB
| May 2010
| 
|-
| Power Pack Classic volume 3| Power Pack (1984) #18–26; Thor #363
| TPB
| March 2011
| 
|-
| Power Pack Classic Omnibus| Power Pack (1984) #1–36; Uncanny X-Men #195, 205; Thor #363; X-Factor Annual 2; Power Pack & Cloak and Dagger: Shelter from the Storm; material from Strange Tales (1987) #13–14
| Oversized hardcover
| March 2020
| 
|-
| Power Pack Classic Omnibus volume 2| Power Pack (1984) #37–62; Excalibur (1988) #29; Power Pack Holiday Special (1992) #1; Power Pack (2000) #1-4; Fantastic Four (1998) #574; FF (2011) #15; Power Pack (2017) #63; Power Pack: Grow Up (2019) #1; material from Marvel Super Heroes (1990) #6; Marvel Fanfare (1982) #55
| Oversized hardcover
| June 2021
| 
|-
| Secret Wars II Omnibus| Power Pack (1984) #18; Secret Wars II #1–9; Uncanny X-Men #198, #202–203; New Mutants #30, #36–37; Captain America #308; Iron Man #197; Fantastic Four #282, #285, #288, #316–319; Web of Spider-Man #6; Amazing Spider-Man #268, #273–274; Daredevil #223; Incredible Hulk #312; Avengers #260–261 and #265–266; Dazzler #40; Alpha Flight #28; Thing #30; Doctor Strange #74; Cloak and Dagger #4; Thor #363; Power Man and Iron Fist #121; Peter Parker, the Spectacular Spider-Man #111; Defenders #152; Quasar #8
| Oversized hardcover
| May 2009
| 
|-
| Essential X-Men volume 6| Power Pack (1984) #27; X-Men #199–213, Annual #9; New Mutants #46, Special Edition #1; X-Factor #9–11; Thor #373–374
| TPB
| September 2005
| 
|-
| Essential X-Factor volume 1| Power Pack (1984) #27; Avengers #262; Fantastic Four #286; X-Factor #1–16, Annual #1; Thor #373–374
| TPB
| November 2005
| 
|-
| X-Men: Mutant Massacre
| Power Pack (1984) #27; Uncanny X-Men #210–214; New Mutants #46; X-Factor #9–11; Thor #373–374; Daredevil #238
| TPB
| January 2010
| 
|-
| X-Men: Fall of the Mutants Omnibus
| Power Pack (1984) #35; Uncanny X-Men #220–227; New Mutants (1983) #55–61; X-Factor (1986) #19–26; Captain America (1968) #339; Daredevil(1964) #252; Fantastic Four (1961) #312; Incredible Hulk (1968) #340
| Oversized hardcover
| October 2011
| 
|-
| X-Men: Inferno Crossovers Omnibus
|Power Pack (1984) #40, 42–44; Avengers #298–300; Fantastic Four #322–324; Amazing Spider-Man #311–313; Spectacular Spider-Man #146–148; Web of Spider-Man #47–48; Daredevil #262–263, 265; Excalibur #6–7; Cloak & Dagger #4
| Oversized hardcover
| September 2010
| 
|-
| Acts of Vengeance Crossovers Omnibus
| Power Pack (1984) #53; Uncanny X-Men #256–258; Fantastic Four #334–336; Wolverine #19–20; Dr. Strange, Sorcerer Supreme #11–13; Incredible Hulk #363; Punisher #28–29; Punisher War Journal #12–13; Marc Spector: Moon Knight #8–10; Daredevil #275–276; Alpha Flight #79–80; New Mutants #84–86; X-Factor #49–50; Damage Control #1–4; and Web of Spider-Man #64–65
| Oversized hardcover
| August 2011
| 
|-
| Power Pack: Pack Attack!
| Power Pack (2005) #1–4
| Digest TPB
| 2005
| 
|-
| X-Men/Power Pack
| X-Men/Power Pack #1–4
| Digest TPB
| 2006
| 
|-
| Avengers/Power Pack: Assemble!
| Avengers/Power Pack: Assemble! #1–4
| Digest TPB
| 2006 
| 
|-
| Spider-Man/Power Pack: Big-City Superheroes
| Spider-Man/Power Pack #1–4
| Digest TPB
| 2007
| 
|-
| Hulk/Power Pack: Pack Smash
| Hulk/Power Pack #1–4
| Digest TPB
| 2007
| 
|-
| Fantastic Four and Power Pack: Favorite Son
| Fantastic Four and Power Pack #1–4
| Digest TPB
| 2008
| 
|-
| Iron Man/Power Pack: Armored and Dangerous
| Iron Man/Power Pack #1–4
| Digest TPB
| 2008
| 
|-
| Power Pack: Day One
| Power Pack: Day One #1–4
| Digest TPB
| 2008
| 
|-
| Wolverine/Power Pack: The Wild Pack
| Wolverine/Power Pack #1–4
| Digest TPB
| 2009
| 
|-
| Skrulls Vs. Power Pack
| Skrulls Vs. Power Pack #1–4
| Digest TPB
| 2009
| 
|-
| Thor and the Warriors Four
| Thor and the Warriors Four #1–4 
| Digest TPB
| 2010
| 
|-
| Power Pack: Powers That Be
| Power Pack (2020) #1–5
| TPB
| June 2021
| 
|}

Power Pack Classic volume 4 was scheduled to be released in March 2013 but was cancelled. It would have contained Power Pack (1984) #27–36 and material from Strange Tales (1987) #13–14.

In other media

TV pilot

Plot

As the Power siblings get ready for a new school year, they must deal with typical kid issues while also balancing their lives as superpowered children when they learn of Dr. Mobius, a phantom that haunts an abandoned house.

Cast

 Nathaniel Moreau as Alex Power
 Margot Finley as Julie Power
 Bradley Machry as Jack Power
 Jacelyn Holmes as Katie Power
 Jonathan Whittaker as Dr. James Power
 Cheryl Wilson as Margaret Power
 Daniel DeSanto as Eddie
 Christian Masten as Harlan
 Rachel Wilson as Tina
 Charlene DiPardo as Rhonda
 Greg Swanson as Dr. Mobius

Production

Following the cancellation of the original comic, Paragon Entertainment Corporation and New World Television developed Power Pack into a live-action show for NBC's Saturday Morning Kids block. While a pilot episode was made, the series was passed on and later picked up by Fox, which chose to broadcast it as a Saturday morning special, on September 28, 1991, rather than ordering an entire series. The 27-minute pilot has subsequently been aired a few times on Fox Kids during the off-season. Minor alterations to the concept were made for the pilot, ranging from the children's parents being aware of their superhuman abilities, Julie's acceleration power being altered to her being able to move at superhuman speed, without the ability to fly, and the "cloud" aspect of Jack's density power being eliminated; he was only able to shrink in size. The children did not wear costumes.

Other television appearances
 All four members of Power Pack (Alex, Julie, Jack, and Katie) have cameo appearances alongside Franklin Richards in The Super Hero Squad Show episode "Support Your Local Sky-Father!".
 The name Power Pack is mentioned in the Ultimate Spider-Man episode "Blade and the Howling Commandos". Spider-Man brought up the name as one of the "big guns" in the superhero community.

Film
In 2000, Marvel Entertainment entered into a joint venture agreement with Artisan Entertainment to turn at least 15 Marvel superhero franchises into live-action films, television series, direct-to-video films, and internet projects. These 15 franchises included an adaptation of Power Pack. In September 2017, Marvel Studios revealed plans to introduce Power Pack into the Marvel Cinematic Universe with their own film in development. Jonathan Schwartz, an executive producer on Guardians of the Galaxy Vol. 2, will oversee the project, with the plot being described as "a Spy Kids–like story".

References

External links
 Marvel Directory (Power Pack)
 Info regarding a future feature film
 Power Pack's 'Site within Writer Marc Sumerak 'Page
 

 
1984 comics debuts
Child characters in comics
Comics by Louise Simonson
Marvel Comics titles
Marvel Comics superhero teams
Marvel Comics child superheroes